Suran Dickson (born 1977) is the chief executive officer (CEO) of the British charity Diversity Role Models, which works to reduce homophobic bullying in schools. She founded the charity in 2011.

In 2014, The Independent on Sunday ranked Dickson 10th in its Rainbow List of influential LGBT people, having ranked her 20th in the 2013 list, and listed her as a "national treasure" in the 2011 list. In 2014, The Guardian listed her 54th in its World Pride Power List, up from 73rd in its 2013 list.

Dickson is a New Zealander, and prior to setting up Diversity Role Models, she worked as a school teacher in New Zealand and the United Kingdom.

See also

References

External links 

 

Date of birth missing (living people)
Living people
British women activists
British LGBT rights activists
New Zealand LGBT rights activists
New Zealand schoolteachers
British schoolteachers
New Zealand women in business
1977 births
Women civil rights activists